Rafael Bienvenido Cruz y Díaz (born March 22, 1939) is a Cuban-American evangelical preacher and father of Texas U.S. Senator Ted Cruz. He has served as a surrogate in his son's political campaigns.

Early life 
Cruz was born in Matanzas, Cuba, in 1939. His father, also named Rafael Cruz, was a salesman for RCA, originally from the Canary Islands, Spain. His mother, Emilia Laudelina Díaz, was a teacher.

Cruz attended Arturo Echemendia primary school in Matanzas. He said he joined the Cuban Revolution as a teenager and "suffered beatings and imprisonment for protesting the oppressive regime," of dictator Fulgencio Batista, although an extensive search by the New York Times found no evidence for his claims. In September 1956 at age 17, Cruz enrolled  at the University of Santiago. According to Cruz, as a teenager, he "didn't know Castro was a Communist". Cruz has stated in interviews that he was jailed by Batista for several days in June or July 1957 and after he was released he applied to and was accepted by the University of Texas (UT) in August 1957. He obtained a student visa after an attorney for the family bribed a Batista official to grant him an exit permit. Cruz said he left with $100 sewn into his underwear, taking a two-day bus ride from Florida, arriving with little or no English to enroll at the University of Texas.

He graduated from UT with a degree in mathematics and chemical engineering in 1961. Cruz states he worked his way through college as a dishwasher, making 50 cents an hour and learned English by going to movies. Upon returning he revisited the same groups to give lectures opposing Castro and the Revolution. Cruz recounts that his younger sister fought against the new regime in the counter-revolution and was consequently tortured. He remained regretful for his early support of Castro and expressed his remorse to his son on numerous occasions.

After Cruz graduated, he was granted political asylum in the United States following the expiration of his student visa. In his late twenties, Cruz moved to New Orleans. In 1969 at age 30, during his employment at his new oil company job, he met Wilmington, Delaware, native and divorcée, Eleanor Elizabeth Wilson (born November, 23, 1934 as Eleanor Darragh). Eleanor's first marriage, at age 21, was to Alan Wilson, a mathematician, in 1956. The couple moved to London, England, for career opportunities in 1960. They divorced in 1963. The then 34-year-old computer programmer returned to the United States in 1966. Cruz and Wilson were married in 1969, and shortly after were sent to Calgary, Canada, where their only child, Rafael Edward "Ted" Cruz, was born on December 22, 1970. While in Calgary, the couple owned a seismic-data processing firm called R.B. Cruz and Associates that provided services for oil drillers. The firm later became Veritas and ultimately part of CGG. Cruz earned Canadian citizenship in 1973. The family of three then moved to Houston, Texas. Eleanor and Rafael Cruz divorced in 1997.

Religious and political beliefs 

Cruz left the Catholic Church in 1975 and became an Evangelical Protestant after attending a Bible study with a colleague and having a born again experience. Explaining his leaving the Catholic church, Cruz stated in an interview with National Review, "The people at the Bible study had a peace that I could not understand, this peace in the midst of trouble. I knew I needed to find that peace by finding Jesus Christ." Following his conversion, his son and wife also became born-again Protestants. In the Cruz home, talk at dinner time was frequently about the Bible.  He was ordained as a pastor in 2004.

Cruz works from his home in Carrollton, a suburb of Dallas, as a traveling preacher and public speaker, campaigning as a surrogate for his son during the 2016 Presidential campaign season. In a 2014 Associated Press story, Cruz was quoted as saying, "I have a burden for this country and I feel that we cannot sit silent."  He went on to say that he feels "It's time we stop being politically correct and start being biblically correct."

About his political involvements in the 1980s, Cruz reflected, "I was on the state board of the Religious Roundtable, a Christian and Jewish religious organization that worked to elect Ronald Reagan." At the time, he told his son, "God has destined you for greatness."

At the New Beginnings Church in Irving, Texas, in August 2012, Cruz delivered a sermon where he described his son's senatorial campaign as taking place within a context where Christian "kings" were anointed to preside over an "end-time transfer of wealth" from wicked people to the righteous. Cruz urged the congregation to "tithe mightily" to achieve that result. During an interview conducted by The Christian Post in 2014, Cruz stated, "I think we cannot separate politics and religion; they are interrelated. They've always been interrelated."
Salon described Cruz as a "Dominionist, devoted to a movement that finds in Genesis a mandate that 'men of faith' seize control of public institutions and govern by biblical principle."

Cruz was involved with his son's 2016 presidential campaign, playing what The Boston Globe described as "a crucial—if sometimes divisive—element of the Texas senator's campaign to win over conservative Christian voters." Also his son's presidential primary opponent, Donald Trump accused Cruz's father of involvement with John F. Kennedy's assassination. During the campaign, Cruz underwent emergency eye surgery, but returned to campaigning after several weeks' recovery.

Personal life 

In 1959, at age 20, Cruz married Julia Ann Garza (August 22, 1939–May 18, 2013). Per Cruz, they divorced some time in 1963. Julia later became a professor of linguistics and Latin American literature at California State University, Stanislaus. They had two daughters, Miriam Cruz (1961–2011) and Roxana Cruz (born November 18, 1962), who is a physician.  He has three grandchildren. 

In 2005, Cruz renounced his Canadian citizenship to become a naturalized U.S. citizen. Cruz now retains only Cuban and American citizenships.

From 1993 to 2009, Cruz was a top salesman for Mannatech.

See also 
 Seven Mountain Mandate

References 

1939 births
Living people
20th-century evangelicals
21st-century evangelicals
American Christian clergy
American evangelicals
American people of Canarian descent
American politicians of Cuban descent
Converts to evangelical Christianity from Roman Catholicism
Cuban emigrants to the United States
Cuban people of Canarian descent
Dominion theology
Naturalized citizens of the United States
People associated with direct selling
People from Calgary
People from Houston
People from Matanzas
People of the Cuban Revolution
Ted Cruz
Texas Republicans
University of Texas alumni